Kiribati consists of 32 atolls and one island scattered over all four hemispheres in an expanse of ocean equivalent in size to the contiguous United States. The islands lie roughly halfway between Hawaii and Australia in the Micronesian and Polynesian regions of the South Pacific. The three main island groupings are the Gilbert Islands, Phoenix Islands, and Line Islands. On 1 January 1995 Kiribati moved the International Date Line to include its easternmost islands and make it the same day throughout the country.

Geography 
Kiribati includes Kiritimati (Christmas Atoll; in the Line Islands), the largest coral atoll (in terms of land area, not dimensions) in the world, and Banaba (Ocean Island), one of the three great phosphate rock islands in the Pacific.

Kiribati straddles the equator in the Pacific Ocean, about one-half of the way from Hawaii to Australia. On 1 January 1995, Kiribati unilaterally moved the International Date Line from the middle of the country to include its easternmost islands and make it the same day throughout the country.

Area 

The total land area mass total  . It includes three island groups - Gilbert Islands, Line Islands, Phoenix Islands. Most of the land on these islands is less than two metres above sea level. Including the amount of water, the total water and land area is 2485 square miles. A 1989 United Nations report identified Kiribati as one of the countries that could completely disappear in the 21st century if steps are not taken to address global climate change.

The coastline of the islands total 1,143 km (710 mi) in length. The islands are relatively flat and very spread out. The highest point, on Banaba Island, is 265 feet above sea level.

Climate 
Due to its location, Kiribati exhibits a maritime climate. Temperatures range between 26 and 32 °C year-round, with the water temperature sitting on a comfortable year-round 28-29 °C. The dry season is from December to March while the wet season last from February to May and from September to November. In the driest years, the islands have received 150mm of rainfall while its wettest years saw upwards of 4000mm.

Land use 
The amount of arable land is at 2.5%. Crop usage stands at about 40% of the available land. A few trees exist and occupy 10% of the land. About 50% of the land is used for housing and commercial use.

Natural environment

Ecoregions 

Kiribati is part of three terrestrial ecoregions:
 the Line Islands are in the Central Polynesian tropical moist forests ecoregion
 the Phoenix Islands are in the Western Polynesian tropical moist forests ecoregion
 the Gilbert islands and Banaba are in the Eastern Micronesia tropical moist forests ecoregion

Natural resources 
Much of the natural resources have been exhausted before its 1979 independence. On the island of Banaba, the British mined phosphorus for guano, until exhaustion of supply, an event that was before independence.

Natural hazards 
Cyclones can occur any time, but usually November to March; occasional tornadoes; low level of some of the islands make them very sensitive to changes in sea level. The Climate Change in the Pacific Report (2011) describes Kiribati as having a low risk of cyclones; however in March 2015 Kiribati experienced flooding and destruction of seawalls and coastal infrastructure as the result of Cyclone Pam, a Category 5 cyclone that devastated Vanuatu.

Pollution 
The island of Banaba has suffered greatly from the after effects of the massive phosphorus mining. Most of the population were forced to evacuate to the island country of Fiji due to its effects. In addition, the atoll near the island of Tarawa is vulnerable to the effects of solid waste disposal. A report by the United Nations say the wildlife from the region are endangered. The islands are very sensitive to the damaging effects.

International conventions 
The country signed the Convention on Diversity on 6 August 1994.

It also signed conventions on the Climate Change-Kyoto Protocol, Desertification, Hazardous Wastes, Law of the Sea, Marine Dumping, Ozone Layer Protection.

Protected area 

This is the second largest marine protected area (MPA) in the Pacific Ocean.

Additional notes 
21 of the 33 islands are inhabited.

Banaba (Ocean Island) in Kiribati is one of the three great phosphate rock islands in the Pacific Ocean.

Kiribati is the only country in the world whose land exists in all four hemispheres.

Extreme points 
This is a list of the extreme points of Kiribati, the points that are farther north, south, east or west than any other location.

 Northernmost point – Teraina (Washington Island), Line Islands
 Easternmost point – Caroline Island, Line Islands
 Southernmost point – Flint Island, Line Islands
 Westernmost point -  Banaba Island

References 

 
Kiribati